Ted Hotaling (born July 12, 1972) is an American college basketball coach and the current head men’s basketball coach at the University of New Haven (2010–present).

Born in upstate New York, Hotaling played at SUNY Albany for coach Richard Doc Sauers. Hotaling also played professional basketball in the National Basketball League (England) for the Cardiff Phoenix Basketball Club and the Plymouth Rotolok Raiders. In 2012, Hotaling was inducted into the SUNY Albany Athletics Hall of Fame as an individual player and as a member of the 1993–1994 men's basketball team who earned a berth in the NCAA Division III, Elite Eight. Hotaling was honored as a member of the Class of 2018 Upstate New York Basketball Hall of Fame on May 20, 2018.

Coaching career

Hotaling was hired by Adelphi University head coach Steve Clifford, former head coach of the Orlando Magic, for the 1998–99 season. Hotaling spent the 1999–2000 season at Yale University under first-year head coach, James Jones. Next, Hotaling worked at New Haven as an assistant to Jay Young from 2000 to 2001. Hotaling returned to Yale University as an assistant to Jones from 2001 to 2005. In 2005, Jeff Neubauer tapped Hotaling to be his top assistant at EKU. Hotaling left EKU in 2010 to become the head coach of the New Haven Charger's men's basketball program. He is the second all-time winningest head coach in the history of the University of New Haven's men's basketball program.

Head coaching record

NCAA DII

References 

American men's basketball players
American men's basketball coaches
Basketball coaches from New York (state)
1972 births
Living people
Albany Great Danes men's basketball players
College men's basketball head coaches in the United States
People from Kinderhook, New York
New Haven Chargers men's basketball coaches
Yale Bulldogs men's basketball coaches
Eastern Kentucky Colonels men's basketball coaches
Adelphi Panthers men's basketball coaches
American expatriate basketball people in the United Kingdom
Basketball players from New York (state)
American expatriate sportspeople in Wales
American expatriate sportspeople in England